Acer tenellum is an uncommon Asian species of maple. It is native to China (Hubei and Sichuan).

Acer tenellum is a small deciduous  tree up to 7 meters tall with smooth  gray bark. Leaves are non-compound, up to 6 cm wide and 6 cm across, thin, usually with 3 lobes but sometimes none.

References

External links
line drawing for Flora of China drawing 1 at bottom

tenellum
Plants described in 1889
Flora of Sichuan
Flora of Hubei